Søren P. Rasmussen (born 6 August 1967) is a Danish politician, who served as mayor of Lyngby-Taarbæk Municipality from 2010 to 2013, elected for Venstre. He was first elected into Lyngby-Taarbæk's municipal council in 2000, and remained on the council until 26 June 2020, where he moved to France.

References

1967 births
Living people
Danish municipal councillors
Mayors of places in Denmark
Conservative People's Party (Denmark) politicians